Magdalena Municipality may refer to:
 Magdalena Municipality, Beni, Bolivia
 Magdalena Municipality, Jalisco, Mexico
 Magdalena Municipality, Veracruz, Mexico
 Magdalena de Kino Municipality, Sonora, Mexico

Municipality name disambiguation pages